Mellea is a genus of moths of the family Thyrididae.

Species
Mellea angustifasciata (Gaede, 1922)
Mellea ordinaria (Warren, 1896)

References

Thyrididae
Moth genera